Dollard may refer to:

Dollard (electoral district), in Quebec, Canada
Dollard (name)
Dollard, Saskatchewan, a community in Canada
Dollart or Dollard, a bay on the border of the Netherlands and Germany

See also
Dollard-des-Ormeaux, colloquially referred to as "Dollard", a city in the West Island
Dollard-Des Ormeaux–Roxboro, a former borough in the West Island area of Montreal, Quebec, Canada
Pierrefonds—Dollard, a federal electoral district in Quebec, Canada
 
 Dollar (disambiguation)